Prince Edward County High School is a public high school located in Farmville community in Prince Edward County, Virginia. It is part of the Prince Edward County School Division.  Athletic teams compete in the Virginia High School League's AA Southside District in Region I.

Prince Edward County High School is known for the landmark cases Davis v. The Prince Edward County Board of Education and Griffin v. the Prince Edward County Board of Education. In 1951, the school, which was then called Moton High School, was all-black and very impoverished. At the time, white students would attend public all-white schools. Davis v. The Prince Edward County Board of Education became one of five others forming the foundation of the landmark case, Brown Versus The Board of Education. By 1959, when the county schools were finally forced to integrate, Prince Edward County reacted by closing their public schools. Moton High School remained closed for several years, and black students who wanted an education were forced out of the county. Moton High was eventually reopened as Prince Edward High School and later renamed Prince Edward County High School.

External links
 Prince Edward County High School

References

Schools in Prince Edward County, Virginia
Public high schools in Virginia